Eupithecia caburgua is a moth in the family Geometridae. It is found in the regions of Santiago (Santiago Province), Araucania (Cautin Province) and Los Lagos (Osorno Province) in Chile. The habitat consists of the Central Valley, Northern Valdivian Forest and the Valdivian Forest biotic provinces.

The length of the forewings is about 8.5–9 mm for females. The forewings are dark greyish brown, with grey, brown, and greyish black scales, and dull reddish brown scaling in the median area, along the cubital vein and at the vein endings. The hindwings are pale grey, with brown and blackish brown scaling distally and along the anal margin. Adults have been recorded on wing in October, January and February.

Etymology
The specific name is based on the type locality.

References

Moths described in 1987
caburgua
Moths of South America
Endemic fauna of Chile